The Rockcastle River is a  river primarily in Rockcastle County, Kentucky, United States. It is a tributary of the Cumberland River and therefore, via the Ohio River, part of the Mississippi River watershed.

Origin of Name 
In 1750 it was discovered by Dr. Thomas Walker and his exploring party, known as the Loyal Company. In his journal he named it the Lawless River, describing it as very steep and rocky. It was soon renamed by hunter Isaac Lindsey who founded Rockcastle County in 1767. Lindsey named the river after the castle-like rock formations.

Course 
The elevation is 888 ft. with the geolocation at (37.171, -84.296). The river has two forks, the Middle Fork, which forms in southern Jackson County, and the South Fork, which forms in Clay County. They meet at the Jackson County line and flow south, forming the southeast border of Rockcastle County. It makes up the border between Pulaski and Laurel counties before flowing into the Cumberland River. Due to the river carving into the Cumberland Plateau, many limestone and sandstone caves are formed. 

The river is used for recreational activities such as kayaking for sport through the rapid waters, and fishing for the many fish species.

Flora and Fauna 
The river has an important native walleye population that has stabilized in recent years. The waters also contain over 65 fish species including rock bass, small mouth bass, with a variety of bluegill and other pan fish. Over 38 mussel species and 10 crayfish species are also found in the waters of the river. The small cave systems formed in the limestone provides a home for several bat species, amphibians, and reptiles. Black bears are known to swim the waters and navigate the rocky banks. The gravel terrain provides life for many rare species of plants such as the Eurybia saxicastelli. The Rockcastle Conservation Initiative formed in 2010 works to protect the diversity of this important habitat.

See also
List of rivers of Kentucky

References

External links
US Forest Service - Rockcastle River Watershed

Rivers of Kentucky
Rivers of Jackson County, Kentucky
Rivers of Clay County, Kentucky
Rivers of Rockcastle County, Kentucky
Rivers of Pulaski County, Kentucky
Rivers of Laurel County, Kentucky
Tributaries of the Cumberland River